Lloyd Ahern II (June 7, 1942) is an American cinematographer. He is the son of late cinematographer Lloyd Ahern (1905—1983).

Filmography

Film
 Madso's War (2010)
 Fab Five: The Texas Cheerleader Scandal (2008)
 The Staircase Murders (2007)
 Broken Trail (2006)
 Undisputed (2002)
 The Unsaid (2001)
 Supernova (2000)
 Last Man Standing (1996)
 Wild Bill (1995)
 Alien Nation: Dark Horizon (1994)
 White Mile (1994)
 Trespass (1992)
 Fine Things (1990)

Television
 Drop Dead Diva (2012) -  13 Episodes
 The Glades (2011) - 4 Episodes
 Army Wives (2007-2009) - 29 Episodes

External links

References

1942 births
American cinematographers
Living people
Artists from Los Angeles